Artin Boshgezenian (1861-1923), was an Armenian deputy for Aleppo in the first (1908–1912), second (April–August 1912) and third (1914–1918) Ottoman Parliaments of the Constitutional Era.

Life
He was a left-leaning politician who supported workers' rights and women's suffrage. He was the author of a motion to make adultery a civil offense for men, as against the traditional view which held only women punishable for adultery.

Speech
During the brief period between the collapse of the Committee of Union and Progress regime in October 1918 and the dissolution of the parliament in December 1918, Boshgezenian made several strong speeches denouncing the outgoing government for crimes committed during the Armenian genocide. He was a judge in the War Crimes Tribunal which led to the conviction and hanging of Kemal Bey, the notorious district governor of Boğazlıyan, who was accused of atrocities against the deported Armenians in the central Anatolian province of Yozgat.

Boshgezenian speaking about the law on deportation,

References

1861 births
1923 deaths
Politicians of the Ottoman Empire
Witnesses of the Armenian genocide
Armenians from the Ottoman Empire